AFL Hall of Fame may refer to:

 Arena Football Hall of Fame, arena football hall of fame
 Australian Football Hall of Fame, Australian rules football hall of fame